The 2013 Maldives FA Cup Final is the 26th Final of the Maldives FA Cup.

Route to the final

* Victory Sports Club withdraw from 2013 FA Cup and the match awarded New Radiant a 2–0 win.

Match

Details

See also
2013 Maldives FA Cup

References

Maldives FA Cup finals
FA Cup